Mir Abdus Shukur Al Mahmud (known as Al Mahmud; 11 July 1936 – 15 February 2019) was a Bangladeshi poet, novelist, and short-story writer. He is considered one of the greatest Bengali poets to have emerged in the 20th century. His work in Bengali poetry is dominated by his frequent use of regional dialects.
In the 1950s he was among those Bengali poets who were outspoken in their writing on such subjects as the events of the Bengali Language Movement, nationalism, political and economical repression, and the struggle against the West Pakistani government.

Early life and career
Mahmud was born in Morail Village of Brahmanbaria District in present-day Bangladesh. His childhood and secondary education days were spent in this village which is located adjacent to Brahmanbaria town.

Mahmud started his career as a journalist. He obtained widespread recognition after Lok Lokantor was published in 1963. In succession, he then penned Kaler Kalosh (1966), Sonali Kabin (1973), and Mayabi Porda Dule Otho (1976). His other notable poetical works include, Arobbo Rojonir Rajhash, Bakhtiyarer Ghora and Nodir Bhitorer Nodi. In addition to writing poetry, he wrote short stories, novels and essays such as Pankourir Rakta and Upamohadesh. In 1971 he went to India and worked there to build public opinion in favour of the Liberation War of Bangladesh. After the war, he joined The Daily Ganakantha as the assistant editor. He was jailed for a year during the regime of the Awami League government. Later, he joined Bangladesh Shilpakala Academy in 1975 and retired in 1993 as director of the academy.

Literary work
Mahmud's literary work Shonali Kabin published in 1973, is considered as a landmark of Bengali poetry. Philosopher Sibnarayan Ray commented:

Selected works

Awards 

 Bangla Academy Literary Award (1968)
 Joy Bangla Award (1972)
 Humayun Kabir Memorial Award (1972)
 Jibonananda Memorial Award (1972)
 Kaji Motaher Hossain Literary Award (1976)
 Kabi Jasim Uddin Award 
 Philips Literary Award (1986)
 Ekushey Padak (1986)
 Nasir Uddin Gold Award (1990)
 Chattagram Sangskriti Kendro Farrukh Memorial Award (1995)
 Alakta Literary Award
 Lalon Award (2011)

References

External links 
 
 
 

1936 births
2019 deaths
People from Brahmanbaria district
Bangladeshi male poets
Bangladeshi male novelists
Bengali-language poets
20th-century Bangladeshi poets
20th-century Bengali poets
20th-century Bangladeshi male writers
Recipients of the Ekushey Padak
Recipients of Bangla Academy Award
Deaths from pneumonia in Bangladesh